Solon Borland (September 21, 1808 – January 1, 1864) was an American physician who served as a United States Senator from Arkansas from 1848 to 1853. In later life, he served as an officer of the Confederate States Army who commanded a cavalry regiment in the Trans-Mississippi Theater of the American Civil War.

Early life
Solon Borland was born on September 21, 1808, in Nansemond County, Virginia to Dr. Thomas Borland, a native of Scotland, and Harriet Godwin Borland. When he was a youth, his family moved to Murfreesboro, North Carolina, where he attended Hertford Academy. Borland also studied medicine in Philadelphia and Louisville. As a captain in 1831, he led a company of Virginia militia forces that were dispatched to Southampton County to fight Nat Turner's slave rebellion. He owned slaves himself.

During the Mexican–American War, Borland was commissioned major of the Arkansas Mounted Infantry Regiment serving under Archibald Yell. Borland served throughout the war, having turned over his newspaper business to associates. He was taken as a prisoner of war by the Mexican army on January 23, 1847, just south of Saltillo. He escaped, and was discharged when his regiment was disbanded and mustered out in June, but continued in the army as volunteer aide-de-camp to General William J. Worth during the remainder of the campaign, from the Battle of Molino del Rey to the capture of Mexico City on September 14, 1847.

Political career
After the war, Borland was elected as a United States Senator to fill the unexpired term of Ambrose Hundley Sevier. His views were generally of a disunionist version, and he was not popular with many Senate members. During an 1850 debate over Southern rights, he physically attacked Mississippi Senator Henry Foote. He discovered soon after his return to Little Rock, Arkansas, that his views were not popular at home, either. In 1852 he opposed the decision of sending Commodore Perry to open Japan to international trade on grounds that the leaders of that country did not offend U.S. interests by refusing to open their country to international trade. Borland resigned from the United States Senate in 1853 and was appointed as Envoy Extraordinary and Minister Plenipotentiary (Nicaragua).

Immediately after his arrival in Managua, Borland called for the U.S. Government to repudiate the Clayton–Bulwer Treaty, and for the American military to support Honduras in the event of a possible war with Great Britain. In a public address in Nicaragua, he stated that it was his greatest ambition to see Nicaragua "forming a bright star in the flag of the United States". He was reprimanded for this by Secretary of State William Marcy. While leaving Greytown in May, 1854, Borland interfered with the local arrest of an American citizen. A crowd had gathered, and a bottle was thrown which hit Borland in the face. Enraged, he reported the incident to the U.S. president, who promptly dispatched a gunboat, and demanded an apology. When none was given, Greytown was bombarded and destroyed.

Borland returned to Little Rock in October 1854, and resumed his medical practice and operation of his pharmacy. Borland declined a nomination from President Pierce as governor of the New Mexico Territory. However he remained active in local politics, and very vocal as to his views on state's rights and secession.

American Civil War
At the start of the American Civil War, Borland was appointed as a commander of Arkansas Militia by Arkansas Governor Henry M. Rector, and ordered to lead the expedition that seized Fort Smith, Arkansas, in the first days of the war, despite the fact that Arkansas had not yet seceded. By the time Borland and his forces arrived in Fort Smith, the Federal troops had already departed, and there were no shots fired. He was replaced as commander at the Arkansas Secession convention less than a month later, but he was able to obtain a position as a commander for Northeast Arkansas. For a time in 1861 he commanded the depot at Pitman's Ferry, near Pocahontas, Arkansas, responsible for troop deployments and supplies. Borland's only son with his third wife, George Godwin Borland, had joined the Confederate States Army despite being only 16 years of age, and would later be killed in action. Borland's first wife, Huldah G. Wright (1809–1837), bore him a son Harold who served in the Confederate States Army as a major, assigned to the Eastern Sub-district of Texas of the Trans-Mississippi Department.

Borland helped recruit troops for the Confederacy during this period, helping to raise the 3d Arkansas Cavalry Regiment on June 10, 1861, becoming its first colonel. The regiment was sent to Corinth, Mississippi, but without Borland. It would eventually serve under Major-General Joseph Wheeler, seeing action in the Second Battle of Corinth and the Battle of Hatchie's Bridge, along with other battles as a part of the Army of Mississippi. However, Borland never left Arkansas.

While in command of northern Arkansas, he ordered an embargo of goods to end price speculation, which was rescinded by Governor Rector. Borland protested that a governor could not countermand an order from a Confederate official, but in January 1862 his order was countermanded by the Confederate States Secretary of War Judah P. Benjamin. In declining health and resenting that embarrassment, Borland resigned from further service to the Confederacy in June, 1862, moving to Dallas County, Arkansas. He died before the war's end, in Harris County, Texas. His burial place is in the old City Cemetery, Houston, Texas.

Personal life
Borland married three times, first in 1831 to Huldah Wright, who died in 1837, and with whom he had two sons. He then married Eliza Buck Hart in 1839, but she died in 1842, with no offspring. In 1843 following his second wife's death, Borland moved to Little Rock, where he founded the Arkansas Banner, which became an influential newspaper in statewide Democratic Party politics. Three years later, Borland challenged the editor of the rival Arkansas Gazette, a Whig newspaper, to a duel due to a slander published against him. In 1845 Borland met Mary Isabel Melbourne. They married that year and had three children.

See also
 List of Arkansas adjutants general
 List of Freemasons
 List of University of Louisville people

References

External links

 Solon Borland at Encyclopedia of Arkansas
 
 Solon Borland at NCPedia (NCpedia.org)
 Solon Borland at The Political Graveyard
 
 
 

1808 births
1864 deaths
People from Nansemond County, Virginia
American people of Scottish descent
Pierce administration personnel
Democratic Party United States senators from Arkansas
American Fire-Eaters
Adjutants General of Arkansas
Ambassadors of the United States to Nicaragua
Physicians from Virginia
American slave owners
American Freemasons
American male non-fiction writers
American political journalists
Editors of Arkansas newspapers
Editors of Tennessee newspapers
Writers from Arkansas
American duellists
19th-century American diplomats
19th-century American male writers
19th-century American newspaper editors
19th-century American non-fiction writers
19th-century American physicians
University of Louisville School of Medicine alumni
American militia officers
United States Army officers
American military personnel of the Mexican–American War
Mexican–American War prisoners of war held by Mexico
Confederate States Army officers
Cavalry commanders
People of Arkansas in the American Civil War
Infectious disease deaths in Texas
Burials in Texas
United States senators who owned slaves